Ain't No Love may refer to:

 "Ain't No Love in the Heart of the City", a 1974 R&B song by Bobby "Blue" Bland 
 Ain't No Love (Ain't No Use), a 1993 song by Sub Sub
 "Ain't No Love" (Charisse Arrington song), 1997
 "Ain't No Love", a song by David Gray